Chen Hsi-huang (born 1931) is a Taiwanese glove puppeteer.

Chen was born in 1931 as the eldest son of Li Tien-lu. He bears his mother's surname because his father had entered a ruzhui marriage to ensure his parents-in-law had a male heir.

Chen was the subject of a 2018 documentary directed by Yang Li-chou and produced by Hou Hsiao-hsien. Father explored the relationship between Chen and Li Tien-lu.

In 2020, he was awarded the National Cultural Award.

References

1931 births
Living people
Taiwanese puppeteers
Taiwanese people of Hoklo descent
Glove puppetry